The Cole-Hopf transformation is a method of solving parabolic partial differential equations (PDEs) with a quadratic nonlinearity of the form:where ,  are constants,  is the Laplace operator,  is the gradient, and  is the -norm. By assuming that , where  is an unknown smooth function, we may calculate:Which implies that:if we constrain  to satisfy . Then we may transform the original nonlinear PDE into the canonical heat equation by using the transformation:

This is the Cole-Hopf transformation. With the transformation, the following initial-value problem can now be solved:The unique, bounded solution of this system is:Since the Cole-Hopf transformation implies that , the solution of the original nonlinear PDE is:

Applications 

 Aerodynamics
 Stochastic optimal control
 Solving the viscous Burgers' equation

References 

Partial differential equations
Transformation (function)
Parabolic partial differential equations